Emmanuel Zulu (born 3 January 1981) is a Zambian footballer.

International competition
Zulu represented Zambia at the 1999 FIFA World Youth Championship as well as in 2002 FIFA World Cup Qualifiers against Togo and Botswana.

Professional competition
Zulu played from 2002-2003 with Perak FA of the Malaysian Super League but was released prior to the 2007 season. He has also played professionally with Supersport United FC in South Africa but had his contract terminated "mainly for excessive beer drinking and indiscipline".

References

1981 births
Living people
Zambian footballers
Zambia international footballers
Zambian expatriate footballers
Expatriate footballers in Malaysia
Expatriate soccer players in South Africa
Zambian expatriate sportspeople in Malaysia
Zambian expatriate sportspeople in South Africa
Perak F.C. players
Association football midfielders